The state attorney general in each of the 50 U.S. states, of the federal district, or of any of the territories is the chief legal advisor to the state government and the state's chief law enforcement officer. In some states, the attorney general serves as the head of a state department of justice, with responsibilities similar to those of the United States Department of Justice.

Selection
The most prevalent method of selecting a state's attorney general is by popular election. 43 states have an elected attorney general. Elected attorneys general serve a four-year term, except in Vermont, where the term is two years.

Seven states do not popularly elect an attorney general. In Alaska, Hawaii, New Hampshire, New Jersey, and Wyoming, the attorney general is a gubernatorial appointee. The attorney general in Tennessee is appointed by the Tennessee Supreme Court for an eight-year term. In Maine, the attorney general is elected by the state Legislature for a two-year term.

The District of Columbia and two U.S. territories, Guam and the Northern Mariana Islands, elect their attorneys general for a four-year term. 2014 marked the first year that the District of Columbia and the Northern Mariana Islands held an election for the office. In American Samoa, Puerto Rico, and the U.S. Virgin Islands, the attorney general is appointed by the governor. In Puerto Rico, the attorney general is officially called the secretary of justice, but is commonly known as the Puerto Rico attorney general.

Many states have passed term limits limiting the selection to 2 consecutive terms (9 states); 2 terms maximum (4 states), but 33 states still have no term limits.

Defense of the state in federal lawsuits
State attorneys general enforce both state and federal laws. Because they are sworn to uphold the United States' constitution and laws as well as the state's, they often decline to defend the state in federal lawsuits.

Current attorneys general
The current party composition of the state attorneys general is:
 23 Democrats
 27 Republicans

The composition for the District of Columbia and the 5 populated territories is:
 3 Democrats
 1 Republican
 1 Independent
 1 New Progressive

Rows of the attorney general table below are color coded indicating the political party of the office holder.

See also
 State constitutional officer (United States)
 National Association of Attorneys General
 List of U.S. statewide elected officials

References

External links

 Listing of official State Attorney General websites

 
State government in the United States